San Marone Martire is a Roman Catholic parish church located in the town of Monteleone di Fermo, in the province of Fermo, region of Marche, Italy.

History
The brick church was erected in the 15th century adjacent to an Augustinian convent. The bell-tower was built using bricks from the old rural church of San Marone. It houses a 16th-century wood crucifix by Fra Bartolomeo da Montelparo, derived from the church of Santa Maria della Misericordia.

References

Churches in the Province of Fermo
15th-century Roman Catholic church buildings in Italy